Dewey is of Welsh origin, the masculine given name is an Anglified spelling of 'Dewi', it is also used as a nickname. 
Notable people with the name include:

 Dewey Balfa (1927–1992), American musician
 Dewey Bartlett (1919–1979), American politician
 Dewey Bozella (born 1959), American professional boxer 
 Dewey Bunnell (born 1952), Anglo-American singer-songwriter, member of America
 Dewey E. Burchett, Jr. (1939–2009), American judge
 Dewey Cooper (born 1974), American kickboxer and boxer
 Dwight Evans (born 1951), American baseball player nicknamed "Dewey"
 Dewey Lambdin (born 1945), American novelist
 Dewey McClain (born 1954), American football player and politician
 Dewey Martin (actor) (born 1923), American actor
 Dewey Martin (musician) (1940–2009), Canadian drummer born Walter Milton Dwayne Midkiff
 Dewey Nicks (born 1961), American photographer
 Dewey Redman (1931–2006), American jazz saxophonist
 Dewey H. Reed (1897-1966), American educator and politician
 Dewey Robinson (1898–1950), American actor
 Dewey Robinson (baseball) (born 1955), American baseball player
 Dewey Short (1898–1979), American politician
 Dewey Smith (1972–2009), American aquanaut
 Dewey Stuit (1909-2008), American educational psychologist and academic administrator
 Dewey Weber (1938–1993), American surfer
 Miles Dewey Davis (1926-1991), American jazz trumpeter

Fictional characters
Dewey Cox, fictional character in the 2007 film Walk Hard: The Dewey Cox Story
Dewey Denouement, fictional character in the A Series of Unfortunate Events novels by Lemony Snicket
Dewey Finn, fictional character in the 2003 film School of Rock
Dewey Jenkins, fictional character in The Boondocks
Dewey Novak, fictional character in the television series Eureka Seven
Dewey Riley, fictional character in the Scream films and in some Scary Movie films
Dewey (Malcolm in the Middle), Malcolm's younger brother in the television series Malcolm in the Middle
Huey, Dewey and Louie, fictional nephews of Donald Duck
Dewey, fictional character in the television series Girl Meets World
Dewey Haik, fictional character in the 1935 novel It Can't Happen Here by Sinclair Lewis
Dewey Andreas, fictional character in Ben Coes Dewey Andreas novels

References

Masculine given names
Lists of people by nickname